Brittany Aubert (born March 9, 1987), better known by the ring name Aubrey Edwards, is an American video game developer and professional wrestling referee signed to All Elite Wrestling (AEW). She is also the promotion's project coordinator and the co-host of AEW Unrestricted with Tony Schiavone.

Career

Video game industry 
Aubert has a background in software engineering and computer science, having previously worked in the video game industry as a producer. Aubert was previously employed by 5th Cell, where she worked on the Scribblenauts video game series for more than six years. She started out as a tool programmer for the series' inaugural title and eventually became lead producer of the Wii U launch title Scribblenauts Unlimited.

Aubert is involved with the ongoing development of AEW Games.

Professional wrestling 
Aubert joined independent promotion 3–2–1 BATTLE! as a referee, initially going under the ring name Gearl Hebner. She began working with other Washington-based promotions such as DEFY and Without a Cause, using the ring name Aubrey Edwards.

In 2018, Edwards made appearances in WWE, working as a referee for the Mae Young Classic and WWE Evolution.

In August 2019, Edwards made history at AEW's All Out by becoming the first woman to referee a professional wrestling world championship match on pay-per-view. She signed with AEW on September 1, 2019, becoming the promotion's first full-time female referee.

Personal life 
Aubert is bisexual. Before becoming a professional wrestling referee, Aubert practiced classical ballet for 21 years.

References

External links 

 
 
 
 Meet Aubrey Edwards: From Video Game Maker To All Elite Wrestling Referee on the official Forbes YouTube channel

1987 births
Living people
All Elite Wrestling personnel
American ballerinas
American software engineers
American video game producers
American women computer scientists
American computer scientists
American women podcasters
American podcasters
Professional wrestlers from Washington (state)
Professional wrestling podcasters
Professional wrestling referees
Sportspeople from Seattle
21st-century American women
American LGBT sportspeople	
Bisexual women
21st-century LGBT people
LGBT professional wrestlers
American women referees and umpires